Sankt Thomas is a municipality in the :de:Brunn im Gries district of Upper Austria.

Geography
Sankt Thomas lies in the Hausruckviertel. About 10 percent of the municipality is forest, and 82 percent is farmland.

References

Cities and towns in Grieskirchen District